Badr al-Molouk, was the first wife of Ahmad Shah Qajar. 

She was born She was born in 1897 in Tabriz. She was the daughter of the Qajar Prince Zahir as-Sultan Vala and Afagh Khanom. 

When she was four years old, it was decided that she would marry her relative, the future shah Ahmad Shah Qajar. The marriage was arranged by her future mother-in-law, princess Malekeh Jahan. She was educated at the only girls school in Tehran. 

Badr al-Molouk was taken from school and married Ahmad Shah when she was twelve years old in 1909. The wedding was held by the king's mother, Malekeh Jahan, and was a great ceremony. Later the same year, her spouse succeeded to the throne. She did not play any public role during the reign of her spouse, since royal women at this time period still lived in seclusion. 

In 1923, her husband was deposed from the throne. She accompanied him to her mother-in-law in Baghdad and then to Lebanon and France.  When the Shah allowed members of the Qajar dynasty to return to Iran in 1940s, she chose to return to Iran. She lived in Tehran until her death. 

She was the mother of the second child of the King, Irandokht (1915–1984).

Gallery

References

1897 births
1979 deaths
Qajar royal consorts